Josefine Einsle is a former German curler.

Teams

References

External links
 

German female curlers
European curling champions
German curling champions
1972 births
Living people